Animacionerite (Bulgarian: Анимационерите) is alternative electronic Bulgarian band from Sofia, under the AveNew label.

The band was established in 1997. In 2000, it won MM award for best alternative rock single for the single "Красива Лулу" and in 2004, award for best Bulgarian album for their album Плюс (Plus). The band reunited to play concerts.

Although the band saw a number of changes in its set-up, main members included Georgi Zgurov (aka Gurko, on lead vocals), Nikolay Barkiev (guitar, lyrics), Tsvetan Methodiev (synthesizers, arranging, programming), Marin Petrov (bass guitar) and Vladimir Vassilev (drums). Other member at times included Petar Borisov and Georgi Ignatov.

Discography

Albums 
2000 - A
2002 - Plus
2016 - Animacionerite

References

External links
Animacionerite Official Site
Animacionerite MySpace Page

Bulgarian musical groups
Culture in Sofia